Jon Drummond (born 1969) is an Australian composer.

Drummond's computer music and installation work has been presented at various Australian and international festivals and galleries including the Adelaide Festival of Arts 2006 and the International Computer Music Conference (Denmark 1994, Canada 1995, Greece 1997, China 1999, Singapore 2003). Recent collaborations with Nigel Helyer, Norie Neumark, Sarah Waterson and Kate Richards have been shown at ISEA Festival 2004 and Australian Centre for the Moving Image Exhibitions 2005.

References
R. Bandt 2002, "Sound Sculpture: Intersections in Sound and Sculpture in Australian Artworks". Sydney: Fine Art Publishing.
R. Vella, 2000, "Musical Environments" Sydney: Currency Press.

External links
Jon Drummond personal web-site
Represented Composer Biography, Australian Music Centre
Move Records: Hearing Place - sound art exploring place from around the world
World Forum for Acoustic Ecology: Soundwalks Online

1969 births
20th-century classical composers
21st-century classical composers
Australian classical composers
Australian male classical composers
Living people
Musicians from Sydney
20th-century Australian male musicians
20th-century Australian musicians
21st-century Australian male musicians
21st-century Australian musicians